Estrella is a station on Line 9 of the Madrid Metro. It is located in fare Zone A. The station is located directly below the M-30 Autopista (motorway), between the districts of Moratalaz to the east and Retiro to the west, and has entrances on both sides.

References

Line 9 (Madrid Metro) stations
Railway stations in Spain opened in 1980
Buildings and structures in Moratalaz District, Madrid
Buildings and structures in Retiro District, Madrid